The Singing Ringing Tree is a 1957 children's fantasy film from East German studio DEFA. Directed by Francesco Stefani, the screenplay by Anne Geelhaar is based on a variation of "Hurleburlebutz" by the Brothers Grimm.

Plot summary
The story concerns a beautiful but selfish and haughty princess who rejects the proposal of a wealthy prince. She scorns the gifts he offers her, and says that she will marry him only if he brings her the mythical "singing ringing tree".  The prince locates the tree in the territory of an evil dwarf, who offers to give him the enchanted tree, on the understanding that, if the princess still rejects him, he will be in the dwarf's power and will be turned into a bear.  Because the tree will only sing and ring when the princess falls in love with the prince, she is disappointed in it and continues to reject the prince.  The prince is forced to return to the dwarf's lair and is turned into a bear.

The princess sends her father to find the singing ringing tree for her, but he is met by the prince, in the guise of a bear, who gives him the tree on condition that the king returns with the first thing the king sees on his return.  This turns out to be the princess, who is now delivered into the hands of the dwarf.  The dwarf, seeing the princess's self-centred behaviour, casts a spell to make her ugly.  The bear tells her that she will regain her beauty only if she changes her ways.  Gradually she is won over by the bear and becomes beautiful again.  Despite the dwarf's attempts to keep her and the prince apart, she eventually falls in love with him and the singing ringing tree finally lives up to its name.

Cast
In credits order.
 Christel Bodenstein as the haughty princess
 Charles Hans Vogt as the king
 Eckart Dux as the handsome prince/bear
 Richard Krüger as the dwarf
 Dorothea Tiesing as the nurse
 Günther Polensen as the captain of the guard
 Fredy Barton as the minister
 Egon Vogel as captain and master of ceremonies
 Paul Knopf as the guardian
 Paul Pfingst as Bauer
 Friedrich Teitge as the gardener
 Maria Besendahl (Anna-Maria Besendahl) as the herbalist
 Tony Bilbow (English narration) as Antony Bilbow

Production
The film was shot in colour entirely in the studio in Potsdam, Brandenburg, East Germany. There was later confusion as to whether the actor who played the dwarf was named Richard Krüger and died in Strasbourg, or was Hermann Emmrich who died in 1995 and is buried in Prenzlau in north eastern Germany. It is now thought that they were one and the same person.

Release
The Singing Ringing Tree was theatrically released in East Germany in 1957, where it sold 5,901,141 tickets in the country of about 17 million. The film was then purchased by the BBC and cut into three parts to create a mini-series with an English-language voice-over track where the original soundtrack was simply faded up and down as opposed to being dubbed. According to the Radio Times entries in BBC Genome Project, it was first broadcast on BBC 1 on 19 and 26 November, and 3 December 1964 as part of the Tales from Europe strand. It was then repeated in March 1966, November 1969, October 1971, September 1976, April 1977 and August 1980.

The original film version has been released in many countries on VHS, DVD and streaming services, and on Blu-ray in Germany by Icestorm Entertainment and the UK by Network Distributing. Both Blu-rays have the film in both its original widescreen theatrical and 1.33:1 television aspect ratios. They also have the original German-language soundtrack with optional voice-over tracks in English, French and Spanish, and various extra features.

UK reactions 
The TV series, partly due to its foreignness as both fairy tale and for the unfamiliarity of its German production, was 'indelibly carved on the psyches' as 'one of the most frightening things ever shown on children's television'. The release of the film on home video also spurred renewed interest. A Radio Times readers' poll in 2004 voted this programme the 20th spookiest TV show ever.

The Fast Show parody
A spoof of the series was created as a sketch in the last season of The Fast Show, entitled, The Singing Ringing Binging Plinging Tinging Plinking Plonking Boinging Tree.

References

External links
 
 The Singing Ringing Tree at Cinema.de

1957 films
1950s children's fantasy films
German children's fantasy films
BBC children's television shows
East German films
1950s German-language films
German children's television series
Babelsberg Studio films
Films about trees
Films based on fairy tales
Dwarves in popular culture
1950s German films